Le Roy Donnelly Downs (April 11, 1900 – January 18, 1970) was a Democratic U.S. Representative  from Connecticut's 4th congressional district from 1941 to 1943.

Early life and family 
He was born in Danbury, Connecticut, April 11, 1900. Downs attended the public schools of his native city. He enlisted on August 27, 1917, and served as a corporal in United States Army, with four months' service in France, being discharged on December 21, 1918. He engaged as a newspaper publisher in South Norwalk, Connecticut, in 1923. He married Mabel Miller, with whom he had one son, William.

Political career 
He served as chairman and member of the Veterans' Home Building Commission 1931–1938. He served as city clerk of Norwalk, Connecticut from 1933 to 1940.

Downs was elected to the Seventy-seventh Congress (January 3, 1941 – January 3, 1943). He was an unsuccessful for reelection in 1942 to the Seventy-eighth Congress, having been defeated by Republican candidate Clare Boothe Luce. He then resumed the newspaper publishing business.

He served as Comptroller of the city of Norwalk, Connecticut from 1943 to 1944 and War Manpower Director for southwestern Connecticut 1944–1946.

He ran unsuccessfully for mayor of Norwalk in 1949 and 1959.

He served as regional representative for the Veterans' Administration in New York, New Jersey, and Pennsylvania from 1961 until his death, January 18, 1970, in Norwalk, Connecticut. He was interred in Riverside Cemetery.

External links

References

1900 births
1970 deaths
United States Army personnel of World War I
Burials in Riverside Cemetery (Norwalk, Connecticut)
Politicians from Danbury, Connecticut
Politicians from Norwalk, Connecticut
United States Army soldiers
Democratic Party members of the United States House of Representatives from Connecticut
20th-century American politicians